Lignite may refer to:

Lignite, a type of low quality coal
Lignite, North Dakota
Lignite, Virginia
USS Lignite (IX-162), a Trefoil-class concrete barge